The Bourne test is a non-invasive and inexpensive diagnostic test for the diagnosis of vesicointestinal fistulae. It has a detection rate of up to 90% for colovesical fistulae. However, it does not provide information on the fistula location and type.

Method
The patient is given a barium enema, after which a urine sample is taken. The sample is then centrifuged and compared radiologically to a control. Either a precipitate of barium or evidence of radiopacity indicates a fistula.

References

Urologic procedures